Peter Jackson's King Kong: The Official Game of the Movie (also known as Peter Jackson's King Kong, or simply King Kong) is a 2005 action-adventure video game developed by Ubisoft Montpellier and published by Ubisoft, based on the 2005 film King Kong. The game was created in collaboration between the film's director Peter Jackson and the game's director Michel Ancel. The game follows New York scriptwriter Jack Driscoll through Skull Island, as he attempts to save love interest Ann Darrow who has been sacrificed by the island's natives to the giant gorilla Kong.

The game allows players to play as both Jack Driscoll and King Kong. Players use firearms and spears as Jack; and punch, grab and use objects/corpses as Kong, to defend against and fight creatures on Skull Island. The King Kong segments are played from a third-person perspective, while the Jack levels are played from a first-person perspective. The game de-emphasizes the role of a heads-up display, with the developers explaining that this conceivably would help players to get further immersed into the game (although the HUD can be turned on in the settings).

It was released on PC and sixth generation platforms and a Nintendo DS version on November 21, 2005, while it was released on November 22, 2005, on the Xbox 360 as a launch title, as well as a Game Boy Advance version titled Kong: The 8th Wonder of the World; also, a PlayStation Portable version was released December 20, 2005. The film's cast members reprise their roles.

Upon release, the console and PC versions received critical acclaim, with critics praising the game's immersive environments and audio, ability to play as both Jack and Kong throughout the game, the voice acting (particularly Naomi Watts and Jack Black's performances), and is often considered one of the best movie based video games of all time. However, the DS version received negative reception due to bugs, poor AI and technical issues, while the PSP version received mixed reviews, with critics liking the inclusion of a multiplayer mode, but criticizing the shorter campaign length.

Since its release, King Kong has gained a significant cult following and has been praised as a revolutionary title in the survival and first-person shooter genres.

Gameplay
In the game, the player assumes the roles of both New York scriptwriter Jack Driscoll and the giant gorilla, King Kong, as they struggle to survive the threats of Skull Island in 1933.

Human levels are controlled from a first person perspective. The game de-emphasizes the role of a heads-up display: it lacks a life bar, aiming reticle, and ammunition readout (the ammo readout and aiming reticle can be turned on and off at the player's will, but is disabled by default), further adding to the challenge and encouraging the player to find alternate weapons and techniques.

Interspersed with human adventure are levels in which the player controls Kong himself, traversing Skull Island's unique geography, battling various giant monsters while defending Ann. The Kong levels take place in a third-person view, as the player directs Kong to punch, grab and use objects/corpses as weapons. He can also bite, climb, charge, hurl enemies and even pound his chest to go into fury mode. When Kong is sent into fury mode, the sky becomes tinted with a golden hue and Kong becomes more powerful and less vulnerable to attack. Many of the Kong sequences fulfill the role of boss fights, as the giant ape is able to effectively battle the gigantic creatures that Jack's weapons cannot harm.

The game features an alternate ending where Kong can be saved during the Empire State Building shootout and safely returned to Skull Island. The ending was approved by Peter Jackson. To unlock the alternate ending, players must complete the entire game and then go back and play through various maps and earn a total of 250,000 points. It can also be accessed by using the cheat codes.

Plot

In 1933, film director Carl Denham (Jack Black), has acquired a mysterious map, which reveals the secret location of a large island known as Skull Island, located in the far reaches of the Pacific Ocean. Carl hires playwright Jack Driscoll (Adrien Brody) to write his script and plucks a starving, out-of-work actress Ann Darrow (Naomi Watts) to play the part of leading lady and a tramp steamer called the Venture to take them to the island. The ship, controlled by Captain Englehorn (Thomas Kretschmann) arrives at the island on October 12. Three lifeboats containing the cast, crew and sailors are dispatched to the island. Due to stormy seas and large rocks, the lifeboat containing Jack, Carl, Ann, Hayes (Evan Parke), and Briggs smashes into a chunk of rocks, killing Briggs.

Hayes shoots out a distress signal, causing Englehorn to come looking for them via the ship's plane and drop ammo supplies for them. The group, after fighting off giant crabs, head onto a rocky outcrop. Carl suggests shooting some test shots for his movie, asking Ann to scream. Her classic damsel-in-distress style wailing is answered by a loud roar. The party progresses forward, meeting up with the second lifeboat containing Preston (Colin Hanks), Jimmy (Jamie Bell) and Lumpy (Andy Serkis), although it cannot land because of the strong current of the sea. The team continue traversing the island, battling many vicious predators such as giant megapedes, scorpio-pedes, and Terapusmordax and are eventually forced to split up as they make their way to a massive wall looming in the distance. Navigating through a seemingly abandoned village, Jack and Ann are captured by the island natives.

Jack is tied to a stake, and watches helplessly as the natives offer Ann to Kong, a  gorilla, as a sacrifice. Carl unties Jack and the two give chase. During the dangerous journey through the jungle, they have an encounter with pack-hunting Venatosaurus, and at one point Jack has to rescue Carl when he gets abducted by a Terapusmordax matriarch. Jack and Carl reunite with Hayes after defeating a pack of Venatosaurus with a .45 caliber Thompson submachine gun. Soon after, they find Preston, Lumpy, Jimmy and Baxter, who are crossing a bridge, but they are attacked by a Vastatosaurus rex. Lumpy is torn apart, Jimmy and Baxter fall down into the ravine, but Preston gets to the other side. Jack is separated from Carl and Hayes, who tell him to continue looking for Ann. Jack eventually finds Ann, but she is kidnapped by a Terapusmordax. Kong comes to the rescue and saves Ann. Jack continues on into the canyon, where he sees a migrating herd of Brontosaurus, and also battles Megapedes and Scorpio-pedes in the surrounding caverns. Jack skillfully navigates around the Brontosaurus herd to acquire a fire to clear their path forward, being chased by Venatosaurs the whole way through. A V. rex attacks the sauropods just as Jack returns with the fire and the trio escape just in time. In the jungle, they save Jimmy, who is being attacked by the Venatosaurs. They eventually get on a raft, where Jimmy tells the group that everyone else is dead. After escaping the Skull Islanders, the team are pursued by two V. rexes down the rapids. Their weapons cannot hurt the predators, and as the rapids give way to slow open rivers, the team is certainly doomed. However Kong arrives just in time with Ann in hand, letting the team know that she's alive. Kong battles and kills the V-rexes. As the team continue their journey, they enter a swamp, and fight against Udusaurs. After leaving the swamp, Kong interrupts their log crossing and tips them into a gorge. Carl's camera is broken and he gives up, heading downstream towards the Venture. Jack, Jimmy and Hayes continue their pursuit of Ann.

Jack eventually saves Ann from a V. rex, and the party attempt to find a long stretch of water of which Englehorn's seaplane can land on. After fighting off some Venatosaurus and a juvenile V. rex in a cave, and leaving another swamp, they finally come across a long stretch of water. Englehorn lands on the water, but is forced to take flight as a V. rex arrives on the scene and chases the group. Ann signals for Kong to come while Jack shoots some Terapusmordax to distract the carnivore. When Kong arrives, Hayes fires his gun on the ape, but the V. rex charges at Kong and inadvertently steps on Hayes, fatally injuring him. Jack and Jimmy stand over Hayes, who tells Jimmy before he dies to get back to the ship. Jack and Jimmy fight many raptors and head back to the stretch of water and find the seaplane. Jimmy leaves with Englehorn and Jack climbs up into the mountains to save Ann.

Jack ascends the mountain, harangued by scavenging Skin-birds roosting among the cliffs. Finally, he makes it into Kong's lair and rescues Ann while Kong fights several cave serpents. Kong gives chase to the fleeing pair, who make their way back to the native village. After leaving the jungle, Ann is captured by the natives once again but Kong saves her. He then heads for the shore where he gets gassed by sailors. He eventually passes out and is taken to New York City, where he is put on display on Broadway. Kong escapes and rampages New York destroying many police cars and army trucks. He eventually finds Ann and takes her up the Empire State Building. He tries to destroy a swarm of biplanes but is eventually shot down. Carl stands beside Kong's body and says "It wasn't the airplanes. It was Beauty that killed the Beast."

An alternate ending is possible. This ending can be unlocked when players replay through various maps and earn a total of 250,000 points. If the player defeats enough biplanes as Kong, the army will light up searchlights on the building so that the biplanes can get clearer shots at Kong, causing Jack and Englehorn to appear in the Venture's seaplane. The player will switch to Jack piloting the seaplane and destroying the searchlights, and shooting down the remaining biplanes to save Kong. Although emergency searchlights are set up, Kong climbs down the Empire State Building. Kong is taken back aboard the Venture and is safely returned to Skull Island. Onboard Englehorn's seaplane, Ann flies around Kong's lair to see Kong one last time to bid farewell to him, as Kong roars triumphantly. The seaplane returns to the departing Venture.

Release
The Xbox 360 release features improved graphics and audio over the sixth-generation console releases. The second PC version, known as the "Gamer's Edition", (originally only available with select graphics cards and later offered on game download services) also includes these improved features.

The "Special Edition" version of the game was available for a limited time. Along with the two standard game discs, included are a bonus disc, containing concept art and a screensaver, and a making-of disc, containing a featurette with Peter Jackson. There was an error in the printing of the discs and the disc labelled "Making of" was actually the "Bonus" disc and vice versa. The signature edition also comes with a Topps trading card of King Kong, a code for a downloadable ringtone, and a cover signed by Peter Jackson.

Technical issues
Symptomatic of early seventh-generation console games, the Xbox 360 version is only set up for HDTV, leaving the image on standard-definition TVs very dark and unsatisfactory for gameplay. As a result, Ubisoft recommended fans buy the Xbox version until a fix for the problem was produced. The patch was eventually released. The Xbox version is not backwards compatible with the Xbox 360. In June 2019, Microsoft added the Xbox 360 version to the Xbox One backwards compatible library.

The retail PC version utilizes the StarForce copy protection system, which may cause unforeseen difficulties for players, especially those using Microsoft Windows 7. No patch has been released by the publisher to remedy this problem. The Gamer's Edition of the game is playable on Windows 7 and in Windows 10 with no issues.

The Xbox 360 version of the game has poorly coded shaders, allowing homebrew and unsigned code to run on the Xbox 360 through modified disc images of the game, which exploited the aforementioned shader engine.

Reception

Peter Jackson's King Kong was a commercial success, selling more than 4.5 million copies by the end of March 2006. The PlayStation 2 version received a "Platinum" sales award from the Entertainment and Leisure Software Publishers Association (ELSPA), indicating sales of at least 300,000 copies in the United Kingdom.

The PC and console versions received positive reviews, with critics praising the game's immersive environments, action sequences, and ability to play as two protagonists throughout the game. However, the Nintendo DS version was widely panned by reviewers because of bugs and glitches, poor level design and enemy AI. The DS version was listed in the 'Flat-Out Worst Game' list of GameSpot's Best & Worst of 2005. The PSP version received mixed reception, mainly for a shorter length, as well as cut down features from the console and PC versions.

Non-video game publications gave the game generally positive reviews as well. The New York Times gave it a favorable review and stated, "The sense of immersion is increased by the game's first-person perspective and an absence of on-screen clutter. There is no health gauge blocking your view; if a dinosaur bites you, your vision blurs, indicating that one more bite will kill you." The A.V. Club gave it a B+ and called it "an instant classic." The Sydney Morning Herald gave it three-and-a-half stars out of five and said of the game, "With a rather abrupt final sequence it does seem to rush to its climax, but despite its brevity, this is an unforgettable trip through the realm of Kong." Detroit Free Press gave the Xbox 360 version three stars out of four and called it "A decent effort. And if you're a gamer who likes movies, this one's got all the cinematic feel and production value of a big-budget film." Maxim, however, gave the PSP version a score of four out of ten and stated that "while the PSP version adds a two-player Co-op mode, it also has wonkier controls than its console cousin, which weren't great to begin with."

As time has passed, the game has been consistently praised as being ahead of its time.

Accolades 
Along with receiving positive reviews, the game and cast received many awards and nominations.

Notes

References

External links
 

2005 video games
Action-adventure games
Dinosaurs in video games
Game Boy Advance games
GameCube games
Jade (game engine) games
King Kong (franchise) video games
Nintendo DS games
PlayStation 2 games
PlayStation Portable games
Single-player video games
Ubisoft games
Video games about primates
King Kong
King Kong
Video games directed by Michel Ancel
Video games developed in France
Video games scored by Chance Thomas
Video games set in 1933
Video games set in New York City
Video games set on fictional islands
Video games with alternate endings
Windows games
Xbox games
Xbox 360 games
Spike Video Game Award winners
Gameloft games
Video games with alternative versions